Doncaster Business School is the international business school of Doncaster College, England. Established in 1992, as Dearne Valley Business School, the school offers postgraduate business degrees in management, including MBAs and professional qualifications (CIPD, CIM, CMI, ILM) as well as undergraduate teaching.

High Melton 

The school is situated in High Melton within the University Centre (validated by the University of Hull and the University of Wales). Site facilities include a nine-hole golf course, learning resource centre and restaurant. High Melton is a small village, dominated by its church and nearby Hall. From the late seventeenth century, the Hall was owned by the Fountayne family and its descendants, the Wilson family, which changed its name to Montagu following an inheritance. The family were major landowners. The Hall is now one of the main buildings on the High Melton campus.

CoVE 
The school was awarded the status of Centre of Vocational Excellence by the Learning Skills Council (LSC) in 2003. It has 500 students on undergraduate, postgraduate and professional programmes, and offers a general MBA. Part-time and flexible modes of study are available.

Qualifications 
Employees of BAE Systems, Marconi, Barnsley MBC, Royal Mail, Ivensys, Mitie, Bridon, Avesta Sheffield, AXA Insurance, Haslam Homes and the Home Office have studied at the school. The average age on the part-time MBA is 37. Male to female ratio for full-time and part-time is about 60:40.

The school offers courses and seminars in entrepreneurship and innovation management via the Innovation Academy.

External links

Business schools in England
Buildings and structures in Doncaster
Education in Doncaster